Hayley Taylor is a singer-songwriter and actress.

Hayley Taylor may also refer to:

Hayley Taylor (presenter), English television presenter
Hayley Lewis, married name Hayley Taylor
Hayley Taylor-Block from List of Fame (1982 TV series) episodes